Matthew Judah Gentry (born July 30, 1982 in Grants Pass, Oregon, United States) is a male freestyle wrestler. Although Gentry was born in the United States, he represented Canada in the Olympics due to holding dual citizenship. He participated in the Men's freestyle 74 kg at the 2008 Summer Olympics and in the Men's freestyle 74 kg at the 2012 Summer Olympics, where he placed 5th.

A quarterfinalist in Beijing, Gentry qualified for his second consecutive Olympic Games appearance by winning gold at the FILA Pan American Olympic qualifier in Kissimmee, Florida defeating Francisco Soler of Puerto Rico in the finals 6-0, 7-0.

Matt Gentry attended college at Stanford University, graduating in 2004 with a degree in Human Biology. As an undergraduate he was "one of the most successful wrestlers in school history", going 42-0 in 2004; that undefeated season made him Stanford's first 157 lbs NCAA champion in wrestling. Once an assistant coach at Stanford, he is currently the assistant coach at The University of Chicago.

Gentry came off a 2011 season that saw him capture a national title in his weight class and win bronze at the Pan American Games in Guadalajara. Overall, Gentry has won three national titles (2006, 2007, 2011) and two Pan American Games bronze medals (2007, 2011).

References

External links
 Matt Gentry's official website
 Wrestling Canada Lutte Profile

American emigrants to Canada
Canadian male sport wrestlers
Olympic wrestlers of Canada
Wrestlers at the 2008 Summer Olympics
Wrestlers at the 2012 Summer Olympics
1982 births
Living people
Sportspeople from Grants Pass, Oregon
Sportspeople from British Columbia
Stanford University alumni
Wrestlers at the 2011 Pan American Games
Pan American Games medalists in wrestling
Pan American Games bronze medalists for Canada
Medalists at the 2011 Pan American Games
20th-century Canadian people
21st-century Canadian people
20th-century American people
21st-century American people